Pluzhnikov (masculine), Pluzhnikova (feminine) is a Russian surname. Notable people with the surname include:

Aleksey Pluzhnikov (born 1991), Russian volleyball player
Konstantin Pluzhnikov (disambiguation), multiple people

Russian-language surnames
ru:Плужников